East Aceh Regency is a regency in eastern Aceh Special Region (Nanggroe Aceh Darussalam) of Indonesia. It is located on the island of Sumatra. The regency covers an area of 6,040.60 square kilometres and had a population of 360,475 at the 2010 Census and 422,401 at the 2020 Census; the official estimate as at mid 2021 was 427,032. The regency capital is the town of Idi Rayeuk.

The regency borders the Malacca Strait to the north-east, the city of Langsa and Aceh Tamiang Regency to the south-east, Gayo Lues Regency to the south, and Central Aceh Regency, Bener Meriah Regency and North Aceh Regency to the west.

Economy 
This regency is rich in petroleum, more so than the North Aceh and Aceh Tamiang regencies. Fishing employs many people in the regency but little of it is exported; people depend on it for food. The main fishing centre in the regency is in Idl. The regency also has several food-plant based industries producing tofu, tempeh and sun-dried banana chips. Some areas are under plantation exploitation for palm oil and rubber, although there is only one state-owned company (TPN I) operating in the area. Plantations also produce cacao and chocolate and in the Lokop area iron ore and lead is mined.

Administrative districts 

The regency is divided administratively into twenty-four districts (kecamatan), listed below with their areas and their populations at the 2010 Census and 2020 Census; together with the official estimates as at mid 2021. The table also includes the locations of the district administrative centres, the number of villages (rural desa and urban kelurahan) in each district, and its postal code.

References 

Regencies of Aceh